Shoangizaw Worku (born 20 October 1946) is an Ethiopian sprinter. He competed in the men's 4 × 400 metres relay at the 1972 Summer Olympics.

References

1946 births
Living people
Athletes (track and field) at the 1972 Summer Olympics
Ethiopian male sprinters
Olympic athletes of Ethiopia
Place of birth missing (living people)